Hypsopygia amoenalis is a species of snout moth in the genus Hypsopygia. It was described by Heinrich Benno Möschler in 1882. It is found in Suriname and Venezuela.

References

Moths described in 1882
Pyralini